Komtoèga is a department or commune of Boulgou Province in eastern Burkina Faso. Its capital lies at the town of Komtoèga. According to the 1996 census the department has a total population of 18,917.

Towns and villages
 Komtoèga (5 038 inhabitants) (capital)
 Dega (1 479 inhabitants)
 Goghin (1 361 inhabitants)
 Goulanda (2 410 inhabitants)
 Komtoega-Peulh (412 inhabitants)
 Pissy (539 inhabitants)
 Samsagbo (1 679 inhabitants)
 Toece (1 139 inhabitants)
 Womzougou (968 inhabitants)
 Yaganse (890 inhabitants)
 Yaoghin (362 inhabitants)
 Yelboulga (683 inhabitants)
 Zoumtoega (1 957 inhabitants)

References

Departments of Burkina Faso
Boulgou Province